The San Javier River (Spanish, Río San Javier) is an anabranch (arm or side channel) of the Paraná River in the province of Santa Fe, Argentina.

Course
The lower Paraná River is highly braided, with a complex system of channels on either side of the main stem. Superficially, the San Javier River seems to be a tributary river originating in the Paraná River's alluvial plain. But it is linked by several channels to the main stem Paraná, from which it probably receives most of its water. It passes by San Javier and Helvecia. Its mouth does not discharge directly into the Paraná River but rather into several channels near Santa Rosa de Calchines. These not only connect to the main stem Paraná but also to other side channels that continue down the west side of the Paraná's floodplain and into the Laguna Setúbal system. Like the San Javier River, the Laguna Setúbal system superficially appears to be a tributary system, but it is cross-cut by channels linked to the main stem Paraná.

History
The San Javier, formerly known as Quiloazas River, was the cause of the abandonment of the initial site of the provincial capital at Cayastá, 85 km upstream from the current one, due to the erosion it caused (and still causes) on the ravine where the town was built.

See also
 List of rivers of Argentina

References

  Seminario Internacional de Ciudades Históricas Iberoamericanas (Toledo, 2001).  Las ciudades históricas como sitios integrales.

Rivers of Argentina
Rivers of Santa Fe Province
Tributaries of the Paraná River